Duit is an extinct Chibcha language, which had been spoken by the Muisca of present-day Boyacá, Colombia. The language appears in the modern name of the pre-Columbian settlement and last ruler Tundama; Duitama.

Description 
The language is only known from one fragment analysed by scholar Ezequiel Uricoechea in 1871. The linguist mentioned that the analysed text was part of a larger work that hitherto has not been found. From the short text it was clear that the Duit language differed slightly from the main version of Chibcha, Muysccubun, spoken by the Muisca on the Altiplano Cundiboyacense.

As the Muisca did not have a script, only for their numerals, written Duit language texts do not exist.

Comparison to Muysccubun and numerals

See also 
Comparison of Muysccubun with other Chibchan languages

References

Bibliography 
 

Languages of Colombia
Chibchan languages
 
Duitama
Extinct languages of South America